Curetis santana is a species of butterfly belonging to the family Lycaenidae. It was described by Frederic Moore in 1857. It is found in Southeast Asia (Myanmar, Indochina, Peninsular Malaya, Thailand, Sumatra, Bangka and Borneo).

Subspecies
Curetis santana santana (Java)
Curetis santana ge Fruhstorfer, 1900 (Nias)
Curetis santana malayica (C. Felder & R. Felder, [1865]) – Malayan sunbeam (northern Myanmar, Indochina to Peninsular Malaysia, Thailand, Sumatra, Bangka, Borneo)

References

External links

Butterflies of Asia
santana
Butterflies described in 1857
Taxa named by Frederic Moore